Christian Heinrich Grosch (21 January 1801 – 4 May 1865) was a Norwegian architect. He was a dominant figure in Norwegian architecture in the first half of the 1800s.

Biography
Christian  Heinrich Grosch was born in Copenhagen, Denmark.  His family moved to Frederikshald (now Halden) in Østfold, Norway during 1811. He was first educated by his father, Heinrich August Grosch (1763-1843) who was a painter, graphic designer and teacher. When The Royal  Drawing School was established in Christiania (now Oslo) in 1818, his father gained employment there as an instructor and re-located the family. Christian Heinrich attended the Royal  Drawing School from 1819 to 1820. He also studied engineering with instructors including Benoni Aubert and Theodor Broch. In 1824, he completed his training at the Royal Danish Academy of Fine Arts in Copenhagen.

Christian  Grosch became Oslo's first "city conductor", which is to say he acted as the city's chief architect, planning engineer, and building inspector. He also accepted private architectural assignments and was responsible for many of the city's landmarks, including the oldest part of Oslo Stock Exchange, the first campus at the University of Oslo, the original building for Norges Bank and the factory building of Prinds Christian Augusts Minde.

During the course of his career,  Grosch was responsible for the architectural design of over 80 churches scattered throughout Norway. From 1833 to his death in 1865 he was appointed state consultant (Statlig bygningsinspektør) for the royal buildings around Christiania. He was succeeded by Georg Andreas Bull. The position is considered as the predecessor of the government agency Statsbygg.

The Grosch medal (Grosch-medaljen) was established  by Groschselskapet as an architecture award in Norway in 2001 on the 200th anniversary of his birth.

Gallery

References

Other sources
 Aslaksby, T. & U. Hamran: Arkitektene C.H.G. og Karl Friedrich Schinkel og byggingen av Det kongelige Frederiks Universitet  (1986)
 Bugge, A. Arkitekten, stadskonduktør C.H.G.: hans slekt, hans liv, hans verk (1928)
 Seip, E. C.H.G.: Arkitekten som ga form til det nye Norge (2001)

External links
Chr. H. Grosch 1801 - 1865, bygninger i Norge
Groschselskapet website

1801 births
1865 deaths
Norwegian urban planners
Burials at the Cemetery of Our Saviour
People from Halden
Royal Danish Academy of Fine Arts alumni
19th-century Norwegian architects
Danish emigrants to Norway
People from Copenhagen